Milošev Konak is the residence of Serbian Prince Miloš Obrenović, which is located in Gornja Crnuća in the municipality of Gornji Milanovac, Serbia, and is one of the Monument of Culture of Exceptional Importance for Serbia, added in 2000. Gornja Crnuća can be considered first, but the temporary capital of Serbia since the prince Miloš Obrenović ruled Serbia for two years from that house. This house is of extreme importance because in it decision was made on raising the Second Serbian Uprising. Permanent exhibition in the house contains copies of documents, photographs and reproductions of several original artifacts related to the insurrectionist period. One of the dormitory has preserved the authentic atmosphere, a fireplace with a part of furniture and built in cocklestove furnace.

See also
Monument of Culture of Exceptional Importance
Tourism in Serbia
House of Obrenović

References

External links 
 Miloš Obrenović House in poor condition
 Permanent exhibition at the Museum of Rudnik-takovskog end

Obrenović dynasty
Cultural Monuments of Exceptional Importance (Serbia)
Architecture in Serbia
Šumadija
Second Serbian Uprising